Klaus Dieter Laser (17 February 1942 – 29 February 2020) was a German actor. Laser's career spanned over five decades, appearing in both German and English-language productions. He achieved recognition for his lead role in the 2009 film The Human Centipede (First Sequence) and also starred in the third entry in 2015. On television, he had a recurring role on Lexx from 1998 to 2000.

Life and career
Laser was born in Kiel, Germany. He was known to English speaking audiences for his roles as Mantrid in Lexx, Prof. Otto Blaettchen in The Ogre, Dr. Josef Heiter in The Human Centipede (First Sequence) and Bill Boss in The Human Centipede 3 (Final Sequence)

In 1975, he was awarded the German Film Award in Gold in the category of Best Actor for his title role in John Glückstadt.

During the filming of The Human Centipede, many crew members and leading actors described Laser as being a method actor. On the days of filming he did not speak to the cast very often and would stay in character as much as he possibly could. Director Tom Six cast him after being impressed with Laser's work in some of his earlier films. For his performance, Laser won Best Actor at the Austin Fantastic Fest and was nominated for the LA Scream Awards for Best Villain in 2010. He returned for the final installment of the franchise after refusing to play the part at first.

Laser starred in the Estonian fantasy film November (shot November 2015). On January 15, 2016, due to appointment collisions in the planning of Sky Sharks, Dieter Laser and Fuse Box Films separated.

Death 
Dieter Laser died twelve days after his 78th birthday on 29 February 2020. His death was not announced until a message to his official Facebook page was posted on 9 April 2020.

Selected filmography 
 1968: In the Jungle of Cities (Im Dickicht der Städte), as Collie Couch alias "The Pavian"
 1973: Desaster, as Alf Harden
 1974: Ermittlungen gegen Unbekannt, as Günter Riegand
 1974-1976: Das Blaue Palais (TV-series), as Enrico Polazzo
 1975: John Glückstadt, as John Glückstadt
 1975: The Lost Honour of Katharina Blum, as Werner Toetges
 1975: , as Miguel
 1976: , as Medardus
 1977: , as Don
 1978: Germany in Autumn, as Member of the board of TV producers
 1978: The Glass Cell (Oscar nominated: Best Foreign Language Film), as David Reinald
 1979: Union der festen Hand (TV film), as Adam Griguszies
 1981: , as Peter Senders
 1982: Wir (based on We, the 1921 Russian novel by Yevgeny Zamyatin)
 1986: Väter und Söhne – Eine deutsche Tragödie (mini series), as Friedrich Deutz
 1990: The Man Inside, as Leonard Schroeter
 1991: Meeting Venus, as Hans von Binder
 1993: , as Ludwig I. von Bayern
 1996: Conversation with the Beast, as Peter Hollsten
 1996: The Ogre, as Prof. Otto Blaettchen
 1997: Shanghai 1937 (Hotel Shanghai), as Dr. Hain
 1997: The Rat (TV film), as Bruno
 2002: Big Girls Don't Cry, as Mr. Winter
 2002: Fuhrer Ex, as Eduard Kellermann
 2003: Baltic Storm, as Gehrig
 2006: , as Bruno
 2009: The Human Centipede (First Sequence), as Dr. Josef Heiter 
 2010:  (TV film), as General Klaus Habenicht
 2015: The Human Centipede 3 (Final Sequence), as Bill Boss
 2017: November, as Baron

References

External links 

Official Facebook site of Dieter Laser

1942 births
2020 deaths
20th-century German male actors
21st-century German male actors
German Film Award winners
German male film actors
German male television actors
Actors from Kiel